The canton of Vincelles is an administrative division of the Yonne department, central France. It was created at the French canton reorganisation which came into effect in March 2015. Its seat is in Vincelles.

It consists of the following communes:
 
Andryes
Charentenay
Coulangeron
Coulanges-la-Vineuse
Courson-les-Carrières
Druyes-les-Belles-Fontaines
Escamps
Escolives-Sainte-Camille
Étais-la-Sauvin
Fontenoy
Fouronnes
Gy-l'Évêque
Les Hauts de Forterre
Irancy
Jussy
Lain
Lainsecq
Levis
Merry-Sec
Migé
Mouffy
Moutiers-en-Puisaye
Ouanne
Sainpuits
Saint-Sauveur-en-Puisaye
Saints-en-Puisaye
Sementron
Sougères-en-Puisaye
Thury
Treigny-Perreuse-Sainte-Colombe
Val-de-Mercy
Vincelles
Vincelottes

References

Cantons of Yonne